Local elections were held in Hyndburn covering one-third of the council seats on 4 May 1995. Labour held 13 of the 16 seats and gained the other 3 seats (St Oswalds, Baxenden & Overton), winning all 16 seats contested. George Slynn was the Labour leader and he held his Netherton seat. Chris Stone had been a Labour Councillor but resigned just weeks before complaining about an authoritarian Labour leadership. The Tories had promised to cut Council Tax whilst Labour ran on the issue of huge Tory cuts from central government to local schools.

Ward results

References

1995 English local elections
1995
1990s in Lancashire